The Battle of Hampden was an action in the British campaign to conquer present-day Maine and remake it into the colony of New Ireland during the War of 1812. Sir John Sherbrooke led a British force from Halifax, Nova Scotia to establish New Ireland, which lasted until the end of the war, eight months later. The brief life of the colony yielded customs revenues which were subsequently used to finance a military library in Halifax and found Dalhousie College.

The subsequent retirement of the British expeditionary force from its base in Castine to Nova Scotia ensured that eastern Maine would remain a part of the United States. Lingering local feelings of vulnerability, however, would help fuel the post-war movement for statehood for Maine. The withdrawal of the British after the ratification of the Treaty of Ghent represented the end of two centuries of violent contest over Maine by rival nations (initially the French and British, and then the British and Americans).

Prelude: Capture of Castine
On August 26, 1814, a British squadron from the Royal Navy base at Halifax moved to capture the Down East coastal town of Machias. The force consisted of five warships: HMS Dragon (74), HMS Endymion (40),  (38),  (18), a large tender, and ten transports carrying some 3,000 British regulars (elements of the 29th, 60th, 62nd, and 98th regiments and a company of Royal Artillery).

The expedition was under the overall command of Sir John Sherbrooke, who was then the lieutenant governor of Nova Scotia. Major General Gerard Gosselin commanded the army and Rear Admiral Edward Griffith Colpoys controlled the naval elements.

The intention of the expedition was clearly to re-establish British title to Maine east of the Penobscot River, an area the British had renamed "New Ireland", and open the line of communications between Halifax and Quebec. Carving off "New Ireland" from New England had been a goal of the British government and the colonies of New Brunswick and Nova Scotia ("New Scotland") since British Brigadier General Francis McLean conquered Maine during the American Revolution. Sherbrooke changed his plan and headed for Castine at the mouth of the Penobscot. He rendezvoused off Matinicus Island and added  (74),  (38),  (18), and the schooner (18) and HM Schooner  (14)  to his force. The complete force entered the cove at Castine on September 1. The local militia melted away at the sight and a 28-man contingent from the U.S. Army under Lieutenant Andrew Lewis of the 40th U.S. Infantry spiked their four 24-pounders, blew up their magazine and withdrew to the north trailing a pair of field pieces.

As the first order of business, Sherbrooke and Griffith issued a proclamation assuring the populace if they remained quiet, pursued their usual affairs and surrendered all weaponry, they would be protected as British subjects. Moreover, the British would pay fair prices for all goods and services provided. Next, Gosselin crossed the bay with most of the 29th to occupy Belfast and protect the left flank of the major operation to follow. Locals did not challenge the occupation, although some 1,200 militiamen gathered three miles outside Belfast to await developments.

Expedition up the Penobscot River
Griffith assigned RN Captain Robert Barrie the task of going after the Adams. Barrie proceeded up the Penobscot with the Dragon, Sylph, Peruvian, the transport Harmony and a prize-tender. The ships carried an armed contingent of some 750 men drawn from the four participating regiments, the artillery company, and some Royal Marines. During the war, Barrie was one of the few British officers in America to acquire a loathsome reputation, which he was about to reinforce.

Battle of Hampden

When Morris entered the river late in August he moved past Buckstown (now Bucksport, Maine) and anchored at the mouth of the Souadabscook Stream in Hampden on the west bank of the Penobscot some 30 miles inland. Anticipating an attack, he placed nine of the ship's guns in battery on a nearby hill and fourteen on the wharf next to his crippled ship. Morris, commanding a crew of 150, called for help from Brigadier General John Blake, commander of the Eastern Militia at Brewer. Blake responded with some 550 militiamen and formed the center of a defensive line running along a ridge facing south, or towards Castine. Lieutenant Lewis showed up with his two dozen or so regulars and two field pieces. Adding a carronade, he went in line to the right or west and commanded the north-south road, the expected route of British attackers.

Late on September 2, Barrie landed his force at Bald Head Cove three miles below Hampden and waited for morning. Early on September 3, in rain and fog, the British moved on Hampden, led by Lt. Colonel Henry John. Skirmishers met with resistance at Pitcher's Brook, primarily from the guns directed by Lewis, but John sent reinforcements and the British stormed across the bridge. In short order, the full force was in position to continue against the American defensive line on the hill. The sight of the oncoming disciplined Redcoats, bayonets glistening, rattled the untrained militia. The center broke and fled to the woods toward Bangor. Morris on the left and Lewis on the right found themselves in untenable positions. About to be overrun, Morris spiked his guns and ignited a train leading to the Adams.  With colors flying, the ship blew up before the British could intervene. Lewis likewise spiked his guns and withdrew to the north. Morris and his navy band made it to Bangor, crossed west through rugged country to the Kennebec River, and around September 9 arrived at their base in Portsmouth, New Hampshire. After two weeks, every sailor reported, not a man missing, a source of great satisfaction for Morris.

At this point, Barrie detailed 200 men to take control of Hampden while he and the balance of his force pursued the Americans in the direction of Bangor. Eighty prominent men of the Hampden area spent a night as prisoners. Most were paroled the next day.

Sacking of Bangor and Hampden

Supported by three of his ships, Barrie entered an intimidated Bangor at midday and called for unconditional submission.  Provisions and quarters were demanded and readily turned over "since the commodore, who was a churlish, brutish monster", according to a correspondent, "threatened to let loose his men and burn the town if the inhabitants did not use greater exertion to feed his men."  Although Barrie ordered a ban on liquor for his troops, some men managed to acquire brandy by the bucket. Accordingly, Barrie ordered an officer to destroy all liquor in the town. This set off a wave of plundering. Six stores fell to the mob and $6,000 worth of property was damaged. Many citizens fled to the woods.  "We are alive this morning," wrote a newspaper correspondent, "but such scenes I hope not to witness again. The enemy's Soldiery ... have emptied all the stores and many dwelling houses - they break windows, and crockery, and destroy every-thing they cannot move."

During the night, the British burned 14 vessels across the river in Brewer. Before the raiders could ignite Bangor vessels, the town's selectmen made a deal. Fearful that the burning would lead to a conflagration, the selectmen offered Barrie a $30,000 bond and agreed to complete four ships on the stocks and deliver them to him in Castine. Barrie accepted the arrangement and carried away a packet, four schooners and a boat. Before moving back down the river on the 4th, Barrie and John paroled 191 locals considered prisoners, including General Blake. Bangor selectmen estimated that the losses and damages totalled $45,000.

The Bangor diversion did not end the difficulties for Hampden. Barrie decided to spend more time in the town. Redcoats terrorized the village, killing livestock for sport and destroying whatever met their fancy, including gardens, furniture, books and papers. Two vessels moored off the town were burned. The rampage prompted a town committee to appeal to Barrie to treat the place with a little humanity. His shocking reply summarized his approach. "Humanity! I have none for you. My business is to burn, sink, and destroy. Your town is taken by storm. By the rules of war we ought to lay your village in ashes, and put its inhabitants to the sword. But I will spare your lives, though I mean to burn your houses." Barrie did not follow through on his threat to burn houses, but he did secure a $14,000 bond on several incomplete vessels on the stocks in town. The terms required the completed vessels be delivered to the Royal Navy in Castine by November 1. In the end, the town estimated the value of its losses to total $44,000.

The British then slipped down to Frankfort and demanded considerable livestock and surrender of all arms and ammunition at that place. The locals were slow to comply and before he moved along on the 7th, Barrie promised to return and make the town pay for its delays. The captain did not make good on this threat, and except for some nuisance sniping at the British as they passed Prospect, the Battle of Hampden was at an end.

Casualties
The British Army loss in the battle was 1 enlisted man killed, 1 officer and 7 enlisted men wounded and 1 enlisted man missing. Four of the casualties were from the 29th Regiment, two from the 62nd Regiment and 4 from the 98th Regiment. The Royal Navy reported 1 sailor from HMS Dragon killed. Two British graves in Hampden remain there today, but no details are carved on the stones. These could be the soldier and sailor killed that day.

American casualties were low, but sources are conflicting. Williamson gives 1 militiaman killed and 11 wounded, with at least two civilians killed by accident. Including the wounded, 84 Americans were taken prisoner. Williamson's data may reflect only the losses to the Hampden militia companies. Captain Barrie could form no estimate, but noted upwards of 30 laying wounded in the woods. Lt. Col. John states he had no correct number, but reported 30 to 40 killed, wounded or missing. Militia leaders could not confirm how many men actually reported for duty. A list for pay purposes was finally produced but is missing entire companies and states no casualties except for one "Tobias Oakman - killed" (the basis for the "1 killed" that Williamson repeated). Claims by citizens for various compensations were filed for numerous years after the battle without a final tally or surviving documentation.

British evacuation of Castine

Sherbrooke declared "New Ireland" (Eastern Maine) a province of British North America (Canada) and left General Gosselin in Castine to govern it. For the next 8 months (from the fall of 1814 to the spring of 1815), the Penobscot River was essentially an international boundary.  That Hampden and Bangor were on the wrong (American) side might have contributed to their rough treatment.

With the signing of the Treaty of Ghent in December 1814, however, the British claim to Maine was effectively surrendered. The British evacuated Castine on April 25, 1815, and the pre-war boundary was restored. The final boundary between the inland, wooded portion of Maine and Canada would remain open to dispute until the Webster-Ashburton Treaty of 1842.

Aftermath
Local memory of this humiliation contributed to subsequent anti-British feeling in Eastern Maine, which would find outlet again in the Aroostook War of 1838-1839. It would also contribute to the postwar movement for Maine's statehood since Massachusetts had failed to protect the region and to the building of a large, expensive granite fort (Fort Knox) at the mouth of the Penobscot River starting in the 1840s.

General Blake and two other officers (Lt. Col. Andrew Grant of Hampden and Maj. Joshua Chamberlain of Brewer, grandfather of the later Civil War general) were court-martialed in Bangor in 1816 for their part in the defeat. Blake and Chamberlain were both exonerated, but Grant was cashiered.

The elderly Blake was court-martialled first and cleared of charges. He then brought charges against his two subordinates, perhaps in a move to clear his name. Grant was found guilty of actions unbecoming an officer before the enemy and banned from being re-elected as a militia officer. One report claims that he ran from battle and changed out of his uniform into civilian clothes before he was eventually captured and identified.

Notes

References
Ellis, James H. A Ruinous and Unhappy War: New England and the War of 1812 New York: Algora Publishing, 2009.

 Smith, Joshua M.  ""The Yankee Soldier's Might: The District of Maine and the Reputation of the Massachusetts Militia, 1800-1812," New England Quarterly LXXXIV no. 2 (June, 2011), 234-264.
 Smith, Joshua M. Making Maine: Statehood and the War of 1812 (2022), Amherst, MA, University of Massachusetts Press
 William D. Williamson, The History of the State of Maine (1832), Hallowell, ME,   online

Hampden
Battles involving the United Kingdom
Conflicts in 1814
Pre-statehood history of Maine
Bangor, Maine
1814 in the United States
Hampden, Maine
Military history of Nova Scotia
Military history of New England
1814 in Maine
September 1814 events